Jonathan Scott Lavine (born May 9, 1966) is an American business executive, co-managing partner of Bain Capital, and philanthroplist. He also serves as chief investment officer of Bain Capital Credit, which he founded in 1997 as Sankaty Advisors, a division of Bain Capital. Lavine is a philanthropist who donated to several U.S. organizations. He is the co-chair of the Board of Trustees of Columbia University.

Early life, education and family
Jonathan Lavine was born in Providence, Rhode Island and graduated from Classical High School in 1984. Lavine then attended Columbia College, where he was elected to Phi Beta Kappa and earned a BA magna cum laude in 1988. 

In 1992, Lavine earned an MBA from Harvard Business School.

Lavine married Jeannie Diane Bachelor in June 1992 at Temple B’nai Abraham in Livingston, New Jersey.  They have two children, Allie and Emily and reside in Lexington, Massachusetts.

Career

Lavine began his career as an analyst at Drexel Burnham Lambert upon his graduation in 1988. From 1991-1993, he worked as a consultant for McKinsey & Company until moving on to Bain Capital. In 1997, Lavine founded Sankaty Advisors, LLC as the credit affiliate of Bain Capital and served as managing partner and chief investment officer of the firm. Sankaty was renamed Bain Capital Credit in 2016.

In 2016, Bain Capital named Lavine co-managing partner of the firm. Lavine continued to lead Bain Capital Credit after becoming co-managing partner of Bain Capital.

On December 6, 2016, President Barack Obama named Lavine to be a member of the United States Holocaust Memorial Council.

In 2008, Lavine also became a member of the Boston Celtics ownership group, Boston Basketball Partners LLC.

Philanthropy
Lavine has served on the board of over ten organizations and educational institutions, including City Year, Boston Children's Hospital, the Dana-Farber Cancer Institute, Columbia University, Horizons for Homeless Children, and Opportunity Nation. 

In 2007, the Lavines formed the Crimson Lion Foundation, a private family foundation through which they have concentrated their philanthropic activities.

Lavine has donated to a number of organizations and institutions, including  City Year, Harvard University, Harvard Business School, LIFT Communities, Equal Justice Initiative, and public radio station WBUR,  and the U.S. Holocaust Museum.  His two largest donations were $10M to City Year in 2012, and $12.5M to Harvard Business School in 2017.

References

Businesspeople from Providence, Rhode Island
Harvard Business School alumni
Columbia College (New York) alumni
Living people
1966 births
Classical High School alumni
Chief investment officers
Obama administration personnel